The 2003 Pan American Race Walking Cup was held in two locations: both 20 kilometres events in Chula Vista, California, United States, on 15 March.  The track of the Cup ran in the Marina Parkway at Chula Vista Marina.  The men's 50 kilometres event was held one week earlier 15 km away in Tijuana, Baja California, México, on 9 March.  Here, the track of the Cup ran in the Paseo de los Héroes, zona del Río Tijuana, and the results were extracted from the inaugural competition of the IAAF World Race Walking Challenge, which was organized as part of the traditional XXVI International Race Walking Week (Spanish: Semana Internacional de la Caminata) held annually since in 1978.

A detailed report for the 50 kilometres event was given by Javier Clavelo Robinson.  Because of a compromise with the transmitting TV companies, the start was scheduled at 10:00 rather than the usual 7:00, causing a great number of drop outs due to the hard climatic conditions during midday.  The decision to move the start time for Mexican television arguably contributed to the first team loss at the 50 km distance in Pan Am Cup history for the host nation as only two of the five declared Mexican scoring team members finished the race, resulting in a team victory for the United States.  The U.S. was the only nation to have three scoring finishers.  Despite failing to finish the required three scoring finishers, the Games Committee awarded Mexico the silver and Ecuador bronze in the team competition based on having two and one finisher respectively in the extreme weather conditions.

Complete results were published.

Medallists

Results

Men's 20 km

Team

Men's 50 km

*: Started as a guest out of competition.
†: Both Miguel Solís and Juan Toscano from México were not listed as members of the official Mexican A Team. Therefore, it remains unclear, whether they were entitled to win medals in the Pan American Race Walk Cup.  One source lists Rogelio Sánchez from the Mexican A Team as 4th. In this case, Cristián Bascuñán from Chile would have been the bronze medal winner.  On the other hand, two other sources list Miguel Solís as bronze medallist.

Team

Women's 20 km

Team

Participation
The participation of 65 athletes from 10 countries (plus 10 guest athletes for the 50 kilometres event) is reported.  In addition, three athletes from overseas were competing for the IAAF World Race Walking Challenge.  The assignment for the official participants of the teams from México and the United States remains unclear.

 (1)
 (2)
 (1)
 (2)
 (3)
 (7)
 (1)
 México (18) ?
 (1)
 (25) ?

Guest countries:

 (1)
 (1)
 (1)

See also
 2003 Race Walking Year Ranking

References

Pan American Race Walking Cup
Pan American Race Walking Cup
Pan American Race Walking Cup
Pan American Race Walking Cup
International track and field competitions hosted by the United States
International athletics competitions hosted by Mexico
Track and field in California
2003 in sports in California